Joseph William Hammond (10 July 1902 – 25 December 1990) was an Australian rules footballer who played with Essendon in the Victorian Football League (VFL).

Family
His brother, Bob Hammond also played VFL football for Hawthorn and St Kilda.

Football
Hammond, a Broadford recruit, was a defender and ruckman.

When he started at Essendon in 1925, the club were coming off back to back premierships, but from round six he was a regular fixture in the team.

Hammond represented Victoria at the 1927 Melbourne Carnival.

He was the club's vice-captain from 1930 to 1932. His career ended in 1932, when he badly injured his groin.

Notes

References

 Maplestone, M., Flying Higher: History of the Essendon Football Club 1872–1996, Essendon Football Club, (Melbourne), 1996. 

1902 births
1990 deaths
Australian rules footballers from Victoria (Australia)
Australian Rules footballers: place kick exponents
Essendon Football Club players